Gae Polisner is an American author of young adult and crossover to adult novels. She is also a practicing family law attorney/mediator. She lives in Long Island with her husband and two sons.

Books 

 2013 The Pull of Gravity
 2015 The Summer of Letting Go
 2017 The Memory of Things
 2018 In Sight of Stars
2020 Jack Kerouac Is Dead to Me
2020, Seven Clues to Home, with Nora Raleigh Baskin

Awards and honors 

 In Sight of Stars 2018, received a Booklist Starred Review, and is the winner of a 2018 AudioFile Earphones Award; Michael Crouch narrating.
 The Memory of Things won the 2019 Golden Archer Award, Senior Division, Wisconsin's Children's Choice book award, and was a 2017 Wisconsin State Reading List final selection, a finalist for the New York Library Association's Three Apples Book Award, and a finalist for the Pennsylvania Keystone to Reading Book Award. It was the recipient of a 2016 Nerdy Book Club Award for Best Young Adult fiction, and was named one of the Most Anticipated YA's of Fall/Winter 2016 by Barnes & Noble Teen Blog, one of the Best New Books for Teens by the Children's Book Review, one of the 15 Must-Read YA Books of Fall by Brightly.com, and one of the Buzzworthy Books of Summer by YABooks Central.
 The Summer of Letting Go was the winner of the 2014 Nerdy Book Club Award Best Young Adult Fiction 2014, and received the Teen Ink Editor’s Badge of Approval.
 The Pull of Gravity was the winner of the 2011 Nerdy Book Club Award for Best YA Fiction; a nominee for the 2011 Yalsa Readers Choice award and the 2011 CYBIL’s Award; included in the 2012 Bank Street College Best Children’s Fiction and 2011 Pennsylvania School Library Association’s List of Best YA Fiction lists; and a 2013-14 National Battle of the Books Pick.
 Her first manuscript, a 2008 piece of women's fiction titled The Jetty, was a Top Semifinalist in the first ever 2008 Amazon Breakthrough Novel Award contest.

References

External links 
 

Year of birth missing (living people)
Living people
Writers from New York (state)
American young adult novelists
People from Long Island
American women lawyers
New York (state) lawyers
21st-century American women